The 1908–09 Ottawa Hockey Club season was the club's 24th season, third in the Eastern Canada Amateur Hockey Association. Ottawa won the league championship and took over the Stanley Cup from the Montreal Wanderers.

Team business 
This was the first season that the Club played as professionals as the amateur clubs dropped out of the league. There was turnover in Ottawa as Harvey Pulford and Alf Smith retired and Tom Phillips left. Ottawa would replace these players with Edgar Dey, Billy Gilmour and Albert 'Dubby' Kerr from Toronto Professionals. Alf Smith would organize the Ottawa Senators of the Federal Hockey League.

Ottawa played an exhibition game prior to the season with the Toronto Professionals on January 2 in Toronto. Ottawa lost to Toronto 5–4. Dubby Kerr played for Toronto, and signed with Ottawa a week later. Kerr had been the subject of a dispute between the Toronto and Berlin teams. The OPHL awarded Kerr to Guelph, but he instead left to join Ottawa.

Regular season 
Marty Walsh would win the scoring championship with 38 goals. Ottawa would average nearly ten goals per game. After losing the first game, Ottawa then won the next ten in a row before losing in the final game of the season, when the league championship was already won.

Final standing

Schedule and results

Goaltending averages

Leading scorers

Ottawa Hockey Club 1909 Stanley Cup Champions

See also 
 1909 ECHA season
 1908 in sports
 1909 in sports
 List of Stanley Cup champions

References 
 Podnieks, Andrew; Hockey Hall of Fame (2004). Lord Stanley's Cup. Triumph Books, 12, 50. .
 
 

Ottawa Senators (original) seasons
Stanley Cup championship seasons
Ott